The Songlines is a 1987 book written by Bruce Chatwin, combining fiction and non-fiction. Chatwin describes a trip to Australia which he has taken for the express purpose of researching Aboriginal song and its connections to nomadic travel. Discussions with Australians, many of them Indigenous Australians, yield insights into Outback culture, Aboriginal culture and religion, and the Aboriginal land rights movement.

Synopsis
Chatwin develops his thesis about the primordial nature of Aboriginal song.  The writing engages the hard conditions of life for present-day indigenous Australians, while appreciating the art and culture of the people for whom the Songlines are the touchstone of reality. The book's first half chronicles the main character's travels through Outback Australia and his various encounters, while the second half is dedicated to his musings on the nature of man as nomad and settler.

Thesis
Chatwin asserts that language started as song, and in the aboriginal Dreamtime, it sang the land into existence for the conscious mind and memory. As you sing the land, the tree, the rock, the path, they come to be, and the singers are one with them. Chatwin combines evidence from Aboriginal culture with modern ideas on human evolution, and argues that on the African Savannah, we were a migratory species hunted by a dominant feline predator. Our wanderings spread "songlines" across the globe (generally from southwest to northeast), eventually reaching Australia, where they are now preserved in the world's oldest living culture.

Reactions
The New York Times review praised the book as "[Chatwin's] bravest book yet", observing that it "engages the full range of the writer's passions" and that "each of his books has been a different delight [and] feast of style and form", but noted that Chatwin failed to bridge the "inevitable" "distance between a modern sensibility and an ancient one" in representing the Aboriginal relationship to their land, and did not sufficiently clearly establish the nature of the Songlines themselves, despite Chatwin's "quoting pertinently" from Giambattista Vico and Heidegger, and while acknowledging the difficulty of so doing, concluded that he ought to have "found some way to make the songs accessible" to the reader. Chatwin's "vision", though "exhilarating", could also at times seem "naive" and "unhistorical"; the review concluded that, nevertheless, Chatwin "remains one of our clearest, most vibrant writers".

John Bayley, in a review for the London Review of Books, called the book "compulsively memorable", but observed the difficulty encountered by the anthropologist in his representation of a culture such as the Aboriginal one Chatwin dealt with: "describing [their] life and beliefs... falsifies them [and] creates a picture of unreality... seductively comprehensible to others"; Chatwin "makes no comparison or comment, and draws no conclusions, but his reader has the impression that anthropologists can't do other than mislead." He however praised "the poetry" of Chatwin's "remarkable pages"; and considered that "the book is a masterpiece".

In The Irish Times, Julie Parsons, after consideration of the difficulties encountered by Chatwin—"born, raised and educated in the European tradition"—in apprehending the nature of the relationship between the Aborigines and the land on which they live, notes that as the reader follows his narrative, they "realise the impossibility of Chatwin's project. The written word cannot express this world", but the book is read nevertheless "with pleasure and fascination. We read it to learn how little we know."

Rory Stewart, in The New York Review of Books, observed that the book "transformed English travel writing", praising his "concision" and "erudition", and acknowledging Chatwin's inspirational character and the view of The Songlines as "almost... a sacred text", leading Stewart and others to travel and "arrange... life and meaning"; he noted that whereas his own travels were at times "repetitive, boring, frustrating", "this is not the way that Chatwin describes the world", nor experienced it. Despite Stewart's conclusion that "today... [his] fictions seem more transparent" and that Chatwin's "personality... learning... myths, even his prose, are less hypnotizing", he considers that "he remains a great writer, of deep and enduring importance." Of particular note was Chatwin's representation of the Aboriginal people he encountered; despite the hardships of their daily existence—sickness, addiction, unemployment—"they are not victims... they emerge as figures of scope, and challenging autonomy."

Literary references
The character Arkady refers to Australia as "the country of lost children".  This was used as the title for Peter Pierce's 1999 book The Country of Lost Children: An Australian Anxiety.

See also

Ethnogeology
Dreaming (Australian Aboriginal art)
Aboriginal title on land rights

References 

1986 books
Mythology books
Books by Bruce Chatwin
Australian Aboriginal culture
Books about Indigenous Australians
British travel books
Books about Australia